Sudip Kumar Gharami (born 21 March 1999) is an Indian cricketer. He made his first-class debut on 9 March 2020, for Bengal in the final of the 2019–20 Ranji Trophy.

References

External links
 

1999 births
Living people
Indian cricketers
Bengal cricketers